Zariqum or Zarriqum was a Sumerian governor (šakkanakkum) of the city of Assur under the Third Dynasty of Ur, attested there between the 44th year of Shulgi and the 5th year of Amar-Sin. 

He is the only governor of the city during this time, otherwise poorly known from surviving sources, to be known by name. Though he has also been suggested to have been an independent ruler, this is a minority view, as Assur is not generally regarded to have been independent before the time of Puzur-Ashur I, . Under the Sumerian Ur III empire, Assur is generally believed to have formed the northernmost peripheral province. In the ruins of one of the city's temples, dedicated to the goddess Ishtar, an inscription by Zariqum states that he founded a new temple in the city, dedicated to the goddess Bēlat-ekallim (i.e. Ninegal), for the life of Amar-Sin, king of Ur. 

Zariqum was previously believed to have had a long and wide-spanning career, also having been a military officer and a governor of Susa in Elam, due to the name Zariqum also being attested for contemporary individuals with those positions. Since the Zariqum who governed Susa governed simultaneously with the time Zariqum is attested as the governor of Assur, they cannot be the same person and must instead simply have been contemporary individuals with the same name.

References

Bibliography 

 
 
 
 

Ancient Assyrians
21st-century BC people